Uldis Ģērmanis was a Latvian historian, writer and publicist born in Novaya Ladoga, Russian Empire. His father was Jānis Ģermanis, and his family returned to the newly independent Latvia in 1919.

He taught history at the University of Latvia in Riga from 1943 and obtained his master's degree. During World War II, he was mobilized to the Latvian Legion and served in the 19th Waffen Grenadier Division of the SS (2nd Latvian) as a military reporter. A few days before the German capitulation, he emigrated to Sweden, where he settled in Solna. In 1974, he received his doctorate in history from the University of Stockholm.

Ģērmanis was, since 1935, a lifelong member of the Latvian student fraternity Fraternitas Livonica. His speciality was modern Latvian history, especially of the Soviet Union and the Latvian Riflemen.

His book  (Blue glass, green ice; 1968) describes his experience researching the story of Vācietis. Ģērmanis was one of the rare émigré Latvians allowed access to primary sources in the Latvian SSR at the time. In the book, he describes the suspicion he was met with by both the Soviet Latvian authorities, and by his fellow émigrés, who questioned his motives for researching the history of pro-Bolshevik Latvians.

In 1958, Ģērmanis living in exile completed "The Latvian Saga", which presents Latvian history, but reads like a novel. As the Latvian Embassy in the USA writes:  In 2007, the eleventh edition was issued in an English version and the works of Ģērmanis are becoming increasingly popular in his native country as well.

His lecture in Toronto, in 1988, about "current events" in the Soviet Union, is considered by many to be the best analysis of the situation at the time.

Uldis Ģērmanis was elected a member of the Latvian Academy of Sciences in 1992 and awarded the Order of the Three Stars in 1995.

Bibliography

References 

1915 births
1997 deaths
20th-century Latvian historians
Latvian emigrants to Sweden
Latvian Waffen-SS personnel
Latvian World War II refugees
Latvian writers
People from Novoladozhsky Uyezd
People from Volkhovsky District
Stockholm University alumni
University of Latvia alumni
Academic staff of the University of Latvia